Sans is a fictional character created by Toby Fox for the 2015 role-playing video game Undertale. Initially appearing as a friendly NPC, he becomes the de facto final boss if the player chooses to complete the "genocide route" and go out of their way to destroy the game's race of monsters. His name is based on the Comic Sans font, which is used for most of his in-game dialogue. Critics praised the character for his dialogue and boss fight, which is considered to be one of the most difficult in the game. His popularity with fans inspired several user-created mods and other types of projects. 

Sans appears in the related game Deltarune. His likeness also appears as a customizable skin for the Mii Gunner character in Super Smash Bros. Ultimate.

History and appearances

In Undertale
Sans is a skeleton wearing a blue jacket, black shorts with white stripes, and white slippers. Prior to the events of Undertale, he had moved to the settlement in Snowdin from an unknown location with his brother Papyrus. Papyrus was hired as a royal guard trainee sentry and forced his brother to help in his quest to capture a human.

Sans first appears in Snowdin, initially appearing as a silhouette approaching the player from behind before shaking the player's hand, setting off a whoopee cushion. He clarifies that he has no interest in capturing humans, unlike Papyrus, whom he describes as a "human-hunting FANATIC". After helping the player hide from Papyrus, Sans follows his brother throughout most of the forest, commentating on his puzzles and even contributing a word search, much to Papyrus's dismay. As the story proceeds, Sans continues performing such antics as attempting to sell the player highly overpriced fried snow. Later in the game, Sans invites the player to eat at a restaurant together. If they so choose, Sans explains how he befriended a woman, Toriel, behind the large door in Snowdin, who shared his love for puns. He reveals that he promised not to kill any humans who come to the Underground and states that if he had not made that promise, the player would have been "dead where [they] stand".

Sans makes one more appearance in the "Judgement Hall", where he reveals the true meaning of the "EXP" and "LOVE" values that the player has accumulated throughout the game: 'Execution Points' and 'Level of Violence', respectively. He judges the player for how high their EXP and LOVE values are before disappearing and allowing the player to proceed and fight the king, Asgore. After the player defeats Asgore and Flowey (if he has not been fought before) and they leave the Underground, Sans calls them to inform them of what occurred after their departure, having different dialogue depending on the player's actions in-game. If the player does not kill any monsters, Sans appears alongside the other main characters after the fight with Asgore is prevented.

If the player opts to kill every monster in each area, Sans's behavior will be different. He threatens the player with a "bad time" if they proceed with their actions before the Papyrus boss fight. If the player ignores Sans's warning and continues slaughtering every monster they meet, he eventually confronts the player in the Judgement Hall to prevent them from destroying all of the Underground, acting as the route's final boss. Sans is revealed to have supernatural abilities and is considered to be extremely powerful, but can be killed by the player.

In Deltarune
Sans appears as a character in Deltarune, where, in Chapter 1, he is found standing outside his shop, a remodeled version of Grillby's from Undertale. He informs the player that he has already met their mother, Toriel, and asks them if they would like to come over to his house to hang out with his brother.

In Chapter 2, the player can enter the shop and find that it has the incongruous interior of a convenience store, with Sans appearing as a cashier, jokingly claiming to be "just the janitor" despite being the sole employee of the store.

In other media
In Super Smash Bros. Ultimate, a Sans costume for the playable Mii Gunner character was released as downloadable content on September 4, 2019. Sans has also been the subject of many fan works and projects, being featured in numerous games, creations, and video game mods.

Development
Sans is listed in the credits as being created by Toby Fox with "special inspiration" from J.N. Wiedle, author of the webcomic Helvetica, a series about an eponymous skeleton named after the Helvetica typeface. His first concept drawing was made by Fox on a college notebook.

The song that plays during his fight, "MEGALOVANIA", was originally composed for an EarthBound ROM hack for Halloween of 2009, where it serves as final boss music for the alternative version of Dr. Andonuts, one of the few major characters from that game. Although the song was later featured in Homestuck, "Megalovania" principally rose in popularity after the release of Undertale, spawning many internet remixes and memes. "Megalovania" has since appeared in games including Taiko no Tatsujin: Drum 'n' Fun! and Super Smash Bros. Ultimate, and was also used by a Spanish dating show, First Dates. The song was also featured in an All Elite Wrestling Halloween special, in which wrestler Kenny Omega wore a Sans costume and was accompanied by the song during his entrance.

He is one of the characters who does not normally use the game's default font in his dialogue; rather, it is usually displayed in lowercase Comic Sans. He only uses the default font if he has stated something serious or, in some cases, threatens the player, and also in a few random instances during normal speech. He is often paired with his brother named Papyrus, also named after a font of the same name.

Reception
Sans's appearance in Undertale was well-received by critics, with Dan Tack of Game Informer praising his boss fight. TheGamer ranked Sans as the third best Undertale character, stating that his jokes were "spot on in delivery". Screen Rant ranked Sans one of the top 7 of the hardest boss fights in video games. During the Undertale Q&A, Sans and Papyrus were the characters that received the most questions from fans. Sans was ranked as one of the best video game characters of the 2010s by Polygon staff and writer Colin Campbell, particularly his appearance and how: "When he makes a joke, the camera zooms in on him while he winks. It never gets old." IGN staff ranked Sans as second of the best final bosses in video games. Matthew Byrd of Den of Geek included Sans placed as 7th of their "best video game NPCs ever", stating that "it’s hard to talk about the game’s best characters for long without the conversation turning to Sans."

Sans has also been well-received by fans of the game, being the subject of many fan works. Professional wrestler Kenny Omega has expressed his love of Undertale, dressing as Sans for the October 30, 2019, episode of All Elite Wrestling: Dynamite. His addition as a Mii fighter costume in Super Smash Bros. Ultimate garnered positive feedback from fans, with fans creating memes and fan-art after the inclusion.

On September 8, 2022, Sans was chosen as the "Ultimate Tumblr Sexyman" (referencing an online slang term for fictional characters who garner romantic and/or sexual interest from a large fanbase despite not being conventionally attractive) via a three-day tournament bracket of polls on Twitter. Sans was a finalist with Mob Psycho 100 character Arataka Reigen, whom Sans surpassed with 50.1% of the vote. Toby Fox responded to the results by writing a short fan fiction comedically dramatizing Reigen's attempts at surpassing Sans in the poll.

References

Fictional skeletons
Video game bosses
Video game characters introduced in 2015
Video game memes
Internet memes introduced in 2015
Undertale
Video game characters who can teleport
Internet memes
Counterparts to the protagonist
Video game characters who use magic
Video game characters who have mental powers
Video game characters with superhuman strength
Fictional bodyguards in video games
Fictional businesspeople in video games
Fictional criminals in video games
Fictional military personnel in video games
Fictional police officers in video games
Politician characters in video games
Religious worker characters in video games
Vigilante characters in video games
Fictional scientists in video games
Fictional secret agents and spies in video games
Fictional characters who can manipulate light
Fictional characters with metal abilities
Fictional characters who can manipulate darkness or shadows
Fictional characters with energy-manipulation abilities
Fictional characters with gravity abilities
Fictional telekinetics
Fictional characters with anti-magic or power negation abilities
Fictional characters with superhuman durability or invulnerability
Fictional characters who can manipulate reality
Fictional characters who can manipulate time
Telepath characters in video games
Fictional technopaths
Fictional characters with extrasensory perception
Video game supervillains
Fictional con artists
Fictional members of secret societies
Fictional beggars